Ardeocomus hemilophoides is a species of beetle in the family Cerambycidae, and the only species in the genus Ardeocomus. It was described by Galileo and Martins in 1988.

References

Calliini
Beetles described in 1988
Monotypic Cerambycidae genera